Ureña Municipality is the one of the 29 municipalities of the state of Táchira in Venezuela.

References

Municipalities of Táchira